Panda pornography (or panda porn) refers generally to movies depicting mating pandas, intended to promote sexual arousal in captive giant pandas. Under zoo conditions, the animals have, in general, proven unenthusiastic about mating, placing their species in danger of extinction. However, in their natural habitat in the wild, pandas are much more successful at mating, particularly as individuals are able to select for behavioural compatibility, as opposed to researchers choosing couples for genetic diversity purposes and trying to predict the narrow window when the females are in the mood.

History
The method was popularized following reports of an experiment performed by zoologists in Thailand, in which they showed several captive giant pandas at Chiang Mai Zoo a number of videos showing other giant pandas mating. Though the researchers behind the project state that they believe there have been successful mating due to usage of mating videos for the animals, such success so far has not been achieved outside of China, where 31 cubs were born over a ten-month period following commencement of the experiment. Other methods, including the use of Viagra to sexually stimulate pandas, have thus far been unsuccessful. Still, panda pornography is thought to be hardly used by most zoo-keepers, as the animals have poor eyesight, making scent and sound more important.

References

Giant pandas
Bear conservation
Animal sexuality
Ethology
Reproduction in mammals
Mating
Mammalian sexuality